Tara Grammy is an Iranian-Canadian actress and playwright.

Life and career
Grammy was born in Tehran, Iran, but grew up in Toronto, Canada. She co-wrote Mahmoud, a  play that was a finalist for the Governor General's Award for English-language drama at the 2015 Governor General's Awards. Grammy played "Nousha" in the 2020 romantic comedy A Simple Wedding,  with award-winning actresses Shohreh Aghdashloo and Rita Wilson. She co-wrote, produced and starred in The Persian Bachelorette, a comedic sketch that was viewed over 150,000 times in a few days on YouTube. 

She is a host on the first season of Persia's Got Talent, a Persian spin-off of the British talent show Got Talent, which was produced in Sweden.

References

External links
 

Living people
Canadian people of Iranian descent
21st-century Iranian actresses
Canadian stage actresses
21st-century Canadian dramatists and playwrights
21st-century Canadian actresses
21st-century Canadian women writers
Canadian women dramatists and playwrights
Year of birth missing (living people)